Issa was a town of ancient Lesbos.

The site of Issa is tentatively located near modern Xerokastrine.

References

Populated places in the ancient Aegean islands
Former populated places in Greece
Ancient Lesbos